Phylostratum is a set of genes from an organism that coalesce to founder genes having common phylogenetic origin.

References

Genetics